Devine Eghosa Ozigbo (born October 2, 1996) is an American football running back who is a free agent. He played college football at Nebraska and signed with the New Orleans Saints as an undrafted free agent in 2019.

Early years
Ozigbo attended and played high school football at Sachse High School.

College career
Ozigbo played at Nebraska from 2015 to 2018. During his collegiate career, he rushed for 2,196 yards on 419 carries with 21 touchdowns.

Professional career

New Orleans Saints
Ozigbo signed with the New Orleans Saints as an undrafted free agent in 2019.

Jacksonville Jaguars
On September 1, 2019, Ozigbo was claimed off waivers by the Jacksonville Jaguars. In Week 17 of the 2019 season, he recorded his first significant statistics in the NFL with nine carries for 27 rushing yards and three receptions for 23 receiving yards in the 38–20 victory over the Indianapolis Colts.

On September 10, 2020, Ozigbo was placed on injured reserve. He was activated on October 24.

On August 31, 2021, Ozigbo was waived by the Jaguars and re-signed to the practice squad the next day.

New Orleans Saints (second stint)
On October 6, 2021, Ozigbo was signed by the New Orleans Saints off the Jaguars practice squad. He was waived on October 30, 2021.

Jacksonville Jaguars (second stint)
On November 1, 2021, Ozigbo was claimed off waivers by the Jacksonville Jaguars. He was waived on November 27, 2021.

New England Patriots
On November 30, 2021, Ozigbo was signed to the New England Patriots practice squad. He signed a reserve/future contract with the Patriots on January 17, 2022.

One May 2, 2022, the New England Patriots released Ozigbo from his contract, making him a free agent.

New Orleans Saints (third stint)
On May 16, 2022, Ozigbo signed with the New Orleans Saints. He was waived on August 21, 2022.

Denver Broncos
On August 22, 2022, Ozigbo was claimed off waivers by the Denver Broncos. He was waived on August 30, 2022 and signed to the practice squad the next day. He was promoted to the active roster on October 29, but waived three days later and re-signed back to the practice squad. He was promoted back to the active roster on November 26. He was released on December 27.

References

External links
Jacksonville Jaguars bio
Nebraska Cornhuskers bio

1996 births
Living people
American football running backs
Denver Broncos players
Jacksonville Jaguars players
Nebraska Cornhuskers football players
New England Patriots players
New Orleans Saints players
People from Collin County, Texas
People from Dallas County, Texas
Players of American football from Texas
Sportspeople from the Dallas–Fort Worth metroplex